Birra Ichnusa, or simply Ichnusa, is the name of a popular Sardinian-made beer, which is brewed in Assemini, a town near the Sardinian capital Cagliari.  It is named after the Latinized ancient name for Sardinia, Hyknusa.

Birra Ichnusa is a lager (4.7% ABV) with a hoppy taste.

Founded in 1912, 
Birra Ichnusa Special is a lager with 5.6% and Ichnusa Cruda a non pasteurized lager with 4.9% alc. Serving temperatures for all of them is 3 °C. A Zwickel-style, unfiltered, 'Ichnusa Non Filtrata' (5.0% ABV) is also available.

Birra Ichnusa was founded in Cagliari in 1912. In 1967 the brewery was finally moved to Assemini. In 1981 more than 400,000 hl beer was brewed. Since 1986 Birra Ichnusa is owned by Heineken.

References

External links
Birra Ichnusa website

Beer brands of Italy
Beer in Italy